Neopostega distola is a moth of the family Opostegidae. It is known only from south-western Brazil and northern Costa Rica.

The length of the forewings is 3.1–3.5 mm. Adults are almost entirely white. Adults are on wing in November.

References

Opostegidae
Moths described in 2007